Alexandre Ubeleski (sometimes Ubelesqui or Ubielesqui) was a French painter. Ubeleski was born in Paris in 1649. He was a pupil of Charles Lebrun, and completed his studies in Rome, where he became a member of the Academy, and where he painted the dome of a chapel in Santa Maria in Transpontina.

On his return to France he was patronized by the Court, became a member of the French Academy in 1682, and Professor in 1695. He died in Paris, April 21, 1718.

Notes and references

Further reading

 
 
 
 
 Barbara Hryszko: Publications

1649 births
1718 deaths
17th-century French painters
French male painters
18th-century French painters
18th-century French male artists